The  was held at Nagai Stadium in Osaka. Organised by JAAF, the four-day competition took place from 9–12 June and served as the national championships in track and field for Japan.

The schedule of events other than this tournament is as follows:
35 kilometres race walk - 17 April (Wajima City)
10,000 m - 7 May (National Stadium)
Combined - 4–5 June (Akita Prefectural Central Park Athletics Stadium, Akita)
Relays - 1 and 2 October (National)
Indoor competition - 4 February 2023 (Osaka Castle Hall, Osaka)
20 kilometres race walk - 19 February 2023 (Rokkō Island, Kobe)
Cross-country race - 2 February 2023 (Uminonakamichi Seaside Park, Fukuoka)

Results

Men
Complete results

References

External links
 Official website at JAAF

2022
Japan Outdoors
Athletics
Sport in Osaka Prefecture
Japan Championships